Eric Ineke (born Haarlem, April 1, 1947) is a Dutch jazz drummer who started his career in the 1960s. After a few years of lessons of John Engels, he gained his first experience as jazzdrummer with singer Henny Vonk and  tenorsaxophonist Ferdinand Povel. Thanks to Pim Jacobs, Ruud Jacobs, Wim Overgaauw, Rita Reys and Piet Noordijk, Eric became well known in the jazz scene. In 1969 he made his first record with tenor saxophonist Ferdinand Povel and through the years he has played with the Rob Agerbeek Quintet and trio, the Rein de Graaff/Dick Vennik Quartet, the Ben van den Dungen/Jarmo Hoogendijk Quintet and the Piet Noordijk Quartet. During his career he has also played with numerous international, mainly American soloists like Hank Mobley, Phil Woods, Lucky Thompson, Dexter Gordon, Johnny Griffin, George Coleman, Shirley Horn, Dizzy Gillespie, Al Cohn, Grant Stewart, Jimmy Raney, Barry Harris, Eric Alexander and Dave Liebman, recorded numerous CD's and appeared at many national and international jazz festivals (North Sea Jazz Festival, Nice Jazz Festival, Pescara Jazz, San Remo, Athens, Toronto Jazz Festival, Montreal International Jazz Festival and New York). For more than 40 years he has been the drummer of the Rein de Graaff Trio and since 2006 has led the Eric Ineke JazzXpress, a quintet in the hard-bop tradition. With this quintet, Ineke got invited in 2011 by the American Jazz Museum in Kansas City with jazz singer Deborah Brown where they did a few performances, including one on Kansas Public Radio and a CD recording produced by Bobby Watson. In October 2016, the JazzXpress presented its latest album Dexternity on the Dutch television in "Vrije Geluiden" of the VPRO.

Ineke also teaches at the Royal Conservatory of The Hague. Ineke is giving masterclasses all around the world. In April 2012 he released his first book The Ultimate Sideman, in conversation with Dave Liebman.

On April 1, 2017, Ineke turned 70 and celebrated this with a ‘Eric Ineke 70 Super Jam’ in the Bimhuis, Amsterdam. During the first half of the concert, Female Deputy Mayor of the Amsterdam city council Simone Kukenheim honored Ineke with a Knightage in the ‘Orde van Oranje Nassau’ for his unbridled dedication to the Dutch Jazz scene.

Discography

As leader 

 The Eric Ineke JazzXpress
 Flames’n’Fire, 2006, Daybreak/Challenge Records (1994)
 For The Love Of Ivie – with Deborah Brown, 2007, Daybreak/Challenge Records (1994), (Edison Award Nomination)
 Xpressions In Time, 2008, Daybreak/Challenge Records (1994)
 JazzXL, Blues, Ballads and Other Bright Moments, 2009, Daybreak/Challenge Records (1994)
 Cruisin, 2014, Daybreak/Challenge Records (1994)
 Dexternity, The Music of Dexter Gordon, 2016, Daybreak/Challenge Records (1994), (Edison Award Nomination)
 What Kinda Bird Is This?, The Music of Charlie Parker, 2020, A&R Challenge Records (1994), (Edison Award Nomination)
 75 years - Swinging, Boppin' and Burnin' , 2022, Ultra Vybe
 Eric Ineke Meets The Tenor players,
 Let There Be Life Love and Laughter, 2017, Daybreak/Challenge Records (1994), (Edison Award Nomination)

As co-leader 

 The Wolfert Brederode/Eric Ineke Quintet
 Trinity, 1999, A-Records/Challenge Records (1994)
 Pictures of You, 2001, A-Records/Challenge Records (1994)
 Dave Liebman/Ineke/Laginha/Pinheiro/Cavalli Quintet
 Is Seeing Believing?, 2016, Daybreak/Challenge Records (1994)
 Pinheiro/Ineke/Cavalli Trio
 Triplicity, 2018, Daybreak/Challenge Records (1994)
 The Music of Bill Evans, 2019, Challenge Records (1994)
 Pekka Pylkkanen/Eric Ineke with Mikael Jakobsson and Heikko Remmel
 Nordic Bop, 2022, Challenge Records (1994)

As sideman 

 With Deborah Brown
 All Too Soon – with The Eric Ineke Jazzxpress/Bobby Watson, 2011, CD.Baby.com
 Brown Beats – with The Beets Brothers, 2012, Maxanter
 With Dave Liebman
 Lieb plays Alec Wilder, 2003, Daybreak/Challenge Records (1994)
 Lieb plays Kurt Weill, 2008, Daybreak/Challenge Records (1994)
 Lieb plays The Blues a la Trane, 2008, Daybreak/Challenge Records (1994)
 Lieb plays The Beatles, 2013, Daybreak/Challenge Records (1994)
 With Al Cohn
 Rifftide, 1987, Timeless Records
 Rifftide, 2016, Timeless Records Jazz Master Collection (Japan)
 With Barry Harris
 Post Masterclass Concert, 1991, Blue Jack
With Jimmy Raney
Raney '81 (Criss Cross, 1981) with Doug Raney and Jesper Lundgaard
 With Ronnie Cuber/Beets Brothers
 Infra Rae, 2009, Maxanter
 With Dave Pike/Charles McPherson (musician)
 Blue Bird, 1988, Timeless Records
 With George Coleman
 On Green Dolphin Street, 1974, Blue Jack
 With Hein van der Gaag  
 The Second Time Around, Hein van der Gaag Trio, 1974, Polydor Records
 With Dexter Gordon
 All Souls, 1972, Dexterity
 Afterhours/The Great Pescara Jam Sessions Vol 1&2, 1973, Ports Song
 Fried Bananas, Live recording VPRO radio 1972, Gearbox label LP( vinyl) GB1535 ( U.K.) and available on CD, 2016
 With Ben Webster
 Live in Hot House – with Tete Montoliu, 1972, not on label
 The Brute and The Beautiful – with Tete Montoliu, 1972, Storyville Records
 With Don Friedman
 Togetherness, 1989, Limetree
 With René Thomas (guitarist)
 Guitar Genius, 1972, RTBF
 With Rein de Graaff  
 Chasin’ The Bird, 1981, Timeless Records
 Bebop, Ballads and Blues, 1981, Timeless Records
 Alone Together – with Frits Landesbergen, 1987, Timeless Records
 Blue Greens & Beans – with David "Fathead" Newman /Marcel Ivery, 1990, Timeless Records
 Tenor Conclave – with Teddy Edwards/Von Freeman/Buck Hill (musician), 1992, Timeless Records
 Thinking of You – with Conte Candoli/Bob Cooper (musician), 1993, Timeless Records
 Bariton Explosion – with Ronnie Cuber/Nick Brignola, 1994, Timeless Records
 Nostalgia – with Barry Harris/Gary Foster (musician)/Marco Kegel, 1994, Timeless Records
 Blue Lights, The Music of Gigi Gryce – with Herb Geller/John Stanley Marshall, 2005, Blue Jack
 Now Is The Time – Compilation, Timeless Records
 Confirmation – Compilation, Timeless Records
 Ornithology – Compilation, Timeless Records
 Good Bait – with Ferdinand Povel/Pete Christlieb, 2008, Timeless Records
 Indian Summer – with Sam Most, 2011, Timeless Records
 Early Morning Blues – with Marius Beets, 2019, Timeless Records
 With Rein de Graaff/Dick Vennik Quartet/Sextet
 Departure, 1971, BASF
 Point Of No Return, 1973, Universe
 Modal Soul, 1977, Timeless Records
 Cloud People, 1984, Timeless Records
 Jubilee, 1989, Timeless Records
 Modal Soul, 2016, Timeless Records Jazz Master Collection  (Japan)
 With Scott Hamilton and Rein de Graaff trio
 Live at the Jazzroom, Breda the Netherlands, 2013, Jazzroom
 With Rob Agerbeek 
 Home Run, 1971, Blue Jack
 Keep the Change, 1975, Munich
 Little Miss Dee, 1980, Limetree

 With Rob Madna
 I Got It Bad And That Ain’t Good, 1976, Atelier Sawano
 Broadcast Business ’76 – with Ferdinand Povel, 1976, Daybreak/Challenge Records (1994)
 The Music of Rob Madna – with  Dutch Jazz Orchestra, 1994/'95, Challenge Records (1994)
 En Blanc et Noir – with Ferdinand Povel, 2000, Daybreak/Challenge Records (1994)
 With Ferdinand Povel
 Calling Joanna, 1969, Cat Jazz
 Live at Café Hopper – with Rob Madna, 2000, Daybreak/Challenge Records (1994)
 With Piet Noordijk
 Piet Noordijk Quartet Live, 1988, Varagram
 The Song is You, 1993, Timeless Records
 Piet plays Bird, 1997, Via Records
 With The Dutch Jazz Orchestra
 Jerry van Rooyen – On the Scene, 1993, Timeless Records
 The Music of Billy Strayhorn, 1995/2002, 4 CD Box, Challenge Records (1994)
 The Lady Who Swings The Band, 2005, Challenge Records (1994)
 Moon Dreams, 2006, Challenge Records (1994)
 Out of the Shadows Billy Strayhorn, 2014, Storyville Records
 With Irv Rochlin
 Quirine, 1980, Limetree
 Line for F.P, 1982, Munich
 With Charles Loos
 Quelque Part, with Charles Loos/John Ruocco/Serge Lazarevitch/Riccardo Del Fra, 1983, LDH
 With The Ben van den Dungen/Jarmo Hoogendijk Quintet
 Speak Up, 1989, Timeless Records
 Run For Your Wife, 1991, Timeless Records
 Double Dutch, 1993, PTSD/EMI
 With Ben van den Dungen Quartet
 Live at Lux & Tivoli, 2021, JWA Records
 With Wolfert Brederode
 Alternate Views, 1997, A-Records/Challenge Records (1994)
 Far Enough – with Nimbus, 1999, Buzz Records/Challenge Records (1994)
 Festina Lente – with Nimbus/Dave Liebman, 2001, Buzz Records/Challenge Records (1994), (Edison Award Nomination)
 En Blanc et Noir – with Jasper Blom, 2003, Daybreak/Challenge Records (1994)
 With Arnold Klos
 Heart Strings, 2002, Atelier Sawano
 One To Get Her, 2003, Atelier Sawano
 Beautiful Love, 2007, Atelier Sawano
 Elsa, 2008, Atelier Sawano
 Peace Piece, 2011, Atelier Sawano
 It could happen to you, 2014, Atelier Sawano
 With Sanna van Vliet
 A Time For Love – with Ferdinand Povel, 2005, Maxanter
 Dance On The Moon – with Joe Cohn/Sjoerd Dijkhuizen, 2009, Maxanter
 With Triplicate
 Three and One, 2010, Self
 With Free Fair
 Free Fair, 1978, Timeless Records   
 Free Fair 2, 1979, Timeless Records
 Free Fair +8, 1981, Limetree
 With Rik van den Bergh/Bart van Lier Quintet
 High slide, Low blow, 2013, Maxanter
 With B.J. Ward/Donn Trenner
 Vocalise, 1970, Catfish
 With Yvonne Walter
 Bittersweet, 2012/2013, September
 With Yvonne Walter and The Marriage in Modern Jazzrevival Band
 Time to Swing - Live at the Headroom, 2021, YK Records
 With Gerry van der Klei/Boy Edgar
 Multifaced Gerry, 1975, Poker
 With The Four Freshmen, Rob van Kreeveld, Koos Serierse and Eric Ineke – with Stan Kenton Orchestra/Ann Richards (singer)
 Road Shows, 1994, Tantara records
 With Laurence Fish
 Sen's Fortress, 2017, O.A.P. Records
 With Joan Benavent
 Opening O3, with Matt Baker, Santi Navalon, Voro Garcia, Toni Beleaguer, 2017, SedaJazz Records
 With The Rob Franken Electrification
 Together with o.a Rob Franken, Joop Scholten and Wim Essed, 2018, 678 records (Vinyl)
 With Aleka Potinga
 Person I Knew, with Ronan Guilfoyle, Chris Guilfoyle, Michael Buckley, 2019, Self production
 With Convection Section/Richard Pulin
 Confrontation, 1972, Munich Records
 With Neerlands Hoop in Bange dagen/Freek de Jonge/Bram Vermeulen
 Neerlands Hoop in Panama, 1971, Imperial Records
 With Gijs Hendriks
 Rockin' , 1972, Polydor Records
 With Casey & The Pressure Group
 Memphis Revisited, 1972, Polydor Records
 With Jossche Monitzs & Hot Club 69
 Hot Club 69, 1972, Polydor Records
 With Joop Hendriks
 Joop Hendrik Quartet feat.Peter Grimston, 1975, Marktown Records
 Both Sides, 1982, Feel The Jazz Vol. 8
 With Mat Mathews Orchestra
 V.S.O.P. with Lee Towers, 1975, Ariola Records
 With Wim Koopmans /Jerry van Rooyen Orchestra 
 I Wish You Love, 1987, IP Records
 With Doug Webb Trio
 Doug Webb in Holland - with Marius Beets, 2019, Daybreak/Challenge Records (1994)
 With Joop Scholten
 Joop Scholten - with Rob Franken, Koos Serierse, 1977, Greensville Records
 With Joan Benavent
 Sunrise, with Bart van Lier, Pep Zaragoza, Miquel Rodriguez, Steve Zwanink, 2019, Seda Jazz Records
 With the Frans Elsen Septet feat. Piet Noordijk
 Norway - Treasures of Dutch Jazz, 2021, NJA Records
 Toots Thielemans meets Rob Franken
 The Studio Sessions 1973-1983, Treasures of Dutch Jazz-  Nederland Jazz Archief ( 2022)

Masterclasses 

 Dworp Summer Jazz Clinics Dworp 1984/1985
 IASJ Meeting New School New York 1994
 IASJ Meeting Accademia Nazionale del Jazz Sienna 1997
 IASJ Meeting Conservatoire de Paris 2000
 New Park Music Centre Dublin 2001
 Conservatoire de Paris 2013
 IASJ Meeting Royal Academy of Music Aarhus 2013
 Universidade Lusiada Lisbon 2014/2016/2017/2022
 Ionian University Corfu 2013/2014/2015/2016/2017/2018/2019
 SedaJazz School Valencia 2014/2016/2017
 IASJ Meeting Universidade Lisboa 2015
 Metropolia University  Helsinki 2015
 Newpark School Dublin 2016/2017
 Lemmens Institute Leuven 2016
 Karelia University Joensuu 2016
 CIT Cork School Of Music, Cork 2017
 Sibelius Academy Helsinki 2017
 Pescara Conservatory 2017
 Drumschool Stefan van de Brug  The Hague 2016/2017
 Escola Superior de Musica de Lisboa, Lisbon 2018/2019
 Dublin City University 2018/2019

References

Sources
 Jazz.com, Encyclopedia of Jazz musicians
 Autobiography Eric Ineke, Muziekencyclopedie
 The Biographical Encyclopedia of Jazz, Leonard Feather and Ira Gitler
 The New Grove Dictionary of Jazz, Barry Kernfeld
 Jazz en Omstreken, Ruud Kuyper
 Jazz in Stijl, Ruud Kuyper
 Belevenissen in Bebop, Coen de jonge
 100 Jaar Jazz in Den Haag, Arie van Breda

External links
Eric Ineke Official Website

1947 births
Living people
Dutch jazz drummers
Male drummers
Bebop drummers
Hard bop drummers
Post-bop jazz musicians
Academic staff of the Royal Conservatory of The Hague
People from Haarlem
Timeless Records artists
Male jazz musicians
Challenge Records (1994) artists